Mohammed Ismael Rasool is an Iraqi-Kurdish journalist who was held in a maximum security prison from 27 August 2015 to 5 January 2016. He was released on bail.

Rasool was initially detained for his reporting on Kurdistan Workers Party (PKK) with Vice journalists Jake Hanrahan and Philip Pendlebury, but they were released on 3 September.

References

Living people
Iraqi journalists
Iraqi Kurdish people
Kurdish journalists
Year of birth missing (living people)